Aleksandr Chayev (born 17 March 1962 in Voronezh) is a Russian former swimmer who competed in the 1980 Summer Olympics.

References

1962 births
Living people
Soviet male freestyle swimmers
Russian male freestyle swimmers
Olympic swimmers of the Soviet Union
Swimmers at the 1980 Summer Olympics
Olympic silver medalists for the Soviet Union
European Aquatics Championships medalists in swimming
Medalists at the 1980 Summer Olympics
Olympic silver medalists in swimming
Universiade medalists in swimming
Universiade gold medalists for the Soviet Union
Medalists at the 1981 Summer Universiade
Sportspeople from Voronezh